Germán Sáenz de Miera Colmeiro (born 25 July 1990), known simply as Germán, is a Spanish footballer who plays as a midfielder.

Club career
Born in Santa Cruz de Tenerife, Canary Islands, Germán was a product of CD Tenerife youth system. He made his senior debut with the B team in the third division, appearing in 17 matches as a substitute in a relegation-ending season.

Germán played his first competitive match with the main squad on 1 May 2011, featuring the last five minutes in the 2–1 away defeat against Granada CF and also being relegated from the second tier at the end of the campaign.

On 25 January 2012, Germán was loaned to division three club CD Dénia – managed by former Tenerife player Nino Lema – for the rest of the season. Roughly one year later, he made a similar move to CD Guijuelo, as the former suffered administrative relegation.

In the 2013 off-season, Germán signed for UD Las Palmas Atlético in his native region. After a career-best 11 goals in a relegation-ending season, he remained in the third division with a one-year deal that he signed at Real Murcia on 30 June 2015.

Personal life
Germán's younger brother, Jorge, was also a footballer. He too was groomed at Tenerife.

References

External links

1990 births
Living people
Spanish footballers
Footballers from Santa Cruz de Tenerife
Association football midfielders
Segunda División players
Segunda División B players
Tercera División players
Segunda Federación players
CD Tenerife B players
CD Tenerife players
CD Dénia footballers
CD Guijuelo footballers
UD Las Palmas Atlético players
Real Murcia players
FC Cartagena footballers
UD Logroñés players
Mérida AD players
UD Ibiza players
FC Jumilla players
UD Alzira footballers